Keelaiyur is a village in the Kilvelur taluk of Nagapattinam district, Tamil Nadu, India. It is located between Nagappattinam and Thiruthuraipoondi. Agriculture is the main occupation in this land-locked village and Paddy is the lone crop which is being cultivated. It is located 20 km from the district capital Nagapattinam and 350 km away from the state capital Chennai.

Demographics 

 census, Keelaiyur had a total population of 3,139 with 1,577 males and 1,562 females.

Education 

As of 2015, Keelaiyur has a Govt Higher Sec School and a Govt elementary school. Both schools have developed engineers, doctors, and teachers since their inception. There is also a Polytechnic and a private Engineering college in Keelaiyur, and the Anna University Campus is located in Thirukkuvalai.

Streets 
 Sivan West Street 
 Middle Street
 North Street
 Mudaliyar Street
 South Street
 School Street
 Kaliammal Koil Street
 Akragaram
 Bazar Street
 Kaathaai Amman temple street
 Naadar Street

Nearby Sightseeings 

  Ettukkudi Murugan Temple
  Thirukuvalai
  Vailankanni Matha Shrine

Transport Facility 
Keelaiyur is connected to neighboring towns by roadway. The ECR from Nagappatinam to Thoothukudi crosses this beautiful village. TNSTC operates additional Bus services from Nagappattinam and Vailankanni to most part of the State and also to the neighbouring states likes Kerela and Puducherri. And the most predominant route is between Pattukkotai and Nagappattinam with the Bus no 428 Series. There are both government and private busses running on the routes connecting the nearby cities Thiruchirappalli and Thanjavur.

Temples
 Vandamarumpoonguzhal Sametha Sri Arunachaleshwarar Temple
 Athiroopavalli Thayar Sametha sri Renganathar Temple
 Mariamman Temple
 Kaliamman Temple
 Ayyanar Temple
 Kathayiamman Temple
 Mangaladevi amman Temple

Nearby places
 Thalachangadu, 5 km
 Thirupoondi, 5 km
 Vailankanni, 10 km
 Ettukkudi, 7 km
 Thirukkuvalai, 5 km

References 

Villages in Nagapattinam district